The Lineup is a 1958 American film noir version of the police procedural television series of the same title that ran on CBS radio from 1950 until 1953, and on CBS television from 1954 until 1960. The film was directed by Don Siegel. It features a number of scenes shot on location in San Francisco during the late 1950s, including shots of the Embarcadero Freeway (then still under construction), the California Academy of Sciences in Golden Gate Park, the War Memorial Opera House, the Mark Hopkins Hotel, and Sutro Baths.

Plot
An international drug-smuggling racket plants heroin on unsuspecting American tourists traveling from Asia, so that the dope can pass through customs undetected. Two psychopathic killers, Dancer and Julian, and their driver McLain then collect the contraband, and they murder several people along the way.  Lt. Ben Guthrie leads the police hunt for the criminals. The head of the heroin ring is a person known only as "The Man".

The story begins when an American tourist disembarking in San Francisco from a cruise ship returning from Hong Kong has his bag stolen by a cabbie.  As the cabbie takes off at high speed, he strikes and kills a police officer.  The cab later crashes and the cabbie is killed.  A police investigation discloses that the cab driver is a heroin addict, and attention is drawn to a heroin smuggling ring.

Dancer and Julian have instructions to retrieve the heroin from the unsuspecting tourists and deliver it to a drop point at Sutro's Museum (a real San Francisco location until it burned down in 1966) where the bag containing the heroin is to be left inside an antique ship's binnacle.  Dancer and Julian are instructed by their contact, Staples, that they must make the drop and be gone before 4:05 pm.  But when it turns out that two of the tourists—Dorothy Bradshaw and her young daughter, Cynthia—had unknowingly disposed of the heroin, Dancer and Julian are in a bind; if they drop off the bag with a large portion of the heroin missing, their lives may be in danger.  Dancer and Julian decide that instead of leaving the bag and departing the premises by 4:05, Dancer will stay, meet The Man and explain why the shipment is short.  Dancer and Julian also kidnap Dorothy and Cynthia and bring them to Sutro's so they can back up the story. They surprise The Man, who turns out to be disabled and in a wheelchair.

But when Dancer meets The Man and explains himself, The Man has an unexpected reaction; he tells Dancer that "nobody ever sees me," and that because Dancer has seen him, "you're dead". The Man slaps Dancer across the face with the bag of heroin and Dancer, enraged, pushes The Man off a balcony, killing him.

Meanwhile, the San Francisco police have spotted the getaway car with Julian, McLain, and the kidnapped Dorothy and Cynthia.  When Dancer exits Sutro's, a high speed car chase ensues, filmed in the area of The Embarcadero.  When the car becomes trapped at a barrier on the Embarcadero Freeway, there is a shootout between Dancer and the police.

Cast
 Eli Wallach as Dancer
 Robert Keith as Julian
 Warner Anderson as Lt. Ben Guthrie
 Richard Jaeckel as Sandy McLain
 Mary LaRoche as Dorothy Bradshaw
 William Leslie as Larry Warner
 Emile Meyer as Inspector Al Quine
 Robert Bailey as Staples
 Raymond Bailey as Phillip Dressler
 Vaughn Taylor as "The Man"
 Cheryl Callaway as Cindy Bradshaw
 Marshall Reed as Inspector Fred Asher

In the film, Warner Anderson and Marshall Reed reprise their roles as Lieutenant Ben Guthrie and Inspector Fred Asher from the TV series. However, Tom Tully's character, Inspector Matt Grebb, is replaced by Inspector Al Quine, played by Emile Meyer. Tully, the series co-star, was not in the film. Anderson, the series star, was given co-star billing instead of star billing; star billing was given to Wallach, who played the movie's main villain.

Reception
Varietys review called it a "moderately exciting melodrama" that spends too much time on the police procedural aspects.  Time Out described it as "more brutal, sadistic and threatening" than The Killers.  Dave Kehr of the Chicago Reader called it "a major B movie by one of Hollywood's most accomplished craftsmen".

The Lineup was preserved by the Academy Film Archive, in conjunction with Sony Pictures, in 1997.

In popular culture
The film contains the line, "When you live outside the law, you have to eliminate dishonesty," of which Jonathan Lethem writes that "Bob Dylan heard it…, cleaned it up a little, and inserted it into 'Absolutely Sweet Marie'" (as  "To live outside the law you must be honest.").

See also
 List of American films of 1958
 Illegal drug trade

References

External links
 
 
 
 

1958 films
1958 crime drama films
American crime drama films
American black-and-white films
Columbia Pictures films
Film noir
Films based on television series
Films directed by Don Siegel
Films set in San Francisco
Films shot in San Francisco
Films with screenplays by Stirling Silliphant
1950s English-language films
1950s American films